Jean François Billeter Chinese name : 毕来德 / 畢來德 Bì Láidé, born 1939 in Basel, Switzerland; is a Swiss sinologist and honorary professor of the University of Geneva, where he created the sinology department in 1987. After directing it for twelve years, he retired in 1999 to spend more time writing.

References

1939 births
Living people
Swiss sinologists
Sinology
French scholars